Credonia Mwerinde (born 1952) was the high priestess and co-founder of the Movement for the Restoration of the Ten Commandments of God, a sect that splintered from the Roman Catholic Church in Uganda. Before founding the movement she was a shopkeeper, brewer of banana beer, and a sex worker.  Mwerinde was also a member of a religious group devoted to the Virgin Mary. She and two other group members approached Joseph Kibweteere in 1989, and said that the Virgin Mary had instructed him to take them in. Kibweteere did, and he was particularly struck by her claim of a Marian apparition near his home, which related to a vision he himself had five years earlier. Together Mwerinde and Kibweteere would found the Movement in 1989.

Background
Mwerinde was part of the trio that led the sect, which included Kibweteere, and Dominic Kataribaabo, an excommunicated priest. However Paul Ikazire, a sect leader who later returned to the Catholic Church, described her as being the true power in the Movement. He said, "The meetings were chaired by Sister Credonia, who was the de facto head of the group. Kibwetere was just a figurehead, intended to impose masculine authority over the followers and enhance the cult's public relations." Mwerinde was also the source of the sect's predictions of an apocalypse and the pronouncements that salvation could only be found with the Virgin Mary's messages.

The Movement grew rapidly and at its height membership was estimated as being between 5,000 and 6,000. Defrocked Catholic priests and nuns joined and worked as theologians. The apocalypse was predicted to occur with the advent of the new millennium. After the Movement was evicted from Rwashamaire, it moved to an estate Mwerinde's father owned in the Kanungu District. With the year 2000 approaching, sect members sold their property and turned the profits over to the group's leadership.

When the world did not end by January 1, a crisis occurred in the Movement. Members began to ask questions and demand the return of their money and property. Police investigators believe that Movement leadership, particularly Mwerinde, began a purge of their followers culminating in the destruction of their Kanangu Church on 17 March 2000 in a fire that killed all 530 inside. Hundreds of bodies were also found at Movement properties across southwestern Uganda. Initially believed to be a mass suicide, police later stated that they were investigating it as a mass murder.

Disappearance and aftermath
Mwerinde is assumed to have survived the church conflagration. Ugandan authorities believe that she left the sect's Kanangu compound in the early hours of March 17. In April 2000, police issued an international warrant for her arrest in connection to the sect killings.

In September 2011, Mwerinde and several other prognosticators who incorrectly predicted various dates for the end of world were jointly awarded an Ig Nobel Prize for "teaching the world to be careful when making mathematical assumptions and calculations".

See also
List of fugitives from justice who disappeared

References

External links
"Religion That Kills", ABC News, 14 February 2001 News story about the phenomenon of cults in Uganda
Seven Years Since the Kanungu Massacre
 Movement for the Restoration of the Ten Commandments of God.
 BBC Report
 Religious Tolerance.org on the Movement 

1952 births
20th-century apocalypticists
20th-century Roman Catholics
21st-century apocalypticists
21st-century Roman Catholics
Founders of new religious movements
Fugitives
Living people
Marian visionaries
Movement for the Restoration of the Ten Commandments of God
Ugandan Roman Catholics